Turbo albofasciatus is a species of sea snail, a marine gastropod mollusk in the family Turbinidae, the turban snails.

Some authors place this genus in the subgenus Turbo (Marmarostoma).

Description
The size of the shell attains 18 mm.

Distribution
This species occurs in the Indian Ocean off Somalia.

References

 Alf A. & Kreipl K. (2003). A Conchological Iconography: The Family Turbinidae, Subfamily Turbininae, Genus Turbo. Conchbooks, Hackenheim Germany

External links
 

Endemic fauna of Somalia
albofasciatus
Gastropods described in 1994